Apley is a hamlet and civil parish in the West Lindsey district of Lincolnshire, England.

Apley may also refer to:
 Apley Castle, a medieval fortified manor in the village of Hadley, Shropshire, England
 Apley Forge, a village in Shropshire, England
 Apley Hall, an English Gothic Revival house located in Stockton, Shropshire
 Alan Graham Apley (1914-1996), British orthopaedic surgeon and educator
 Apley grind test, used to evaluate individuals for problems in the meniscus of the knee, devised by Alan Graham Apley

See also
 Appley (disambiguation)
 The Late George Apley, a 1937 novel by John Phillips Marquand
 The Late George Apley (film), a 1947 American film based on the novel